Dodge City Public Library, located north of downtown at 1001 N 2nd Ave, Dodge City, Kansas, is the city's main library. A member of the Southwest Kansas Library System, it has a collection of approximately 123,000 volumes, and it circulates more than 189,000 items annually. It offers several services to the public, including computer classes, public internet access, and programs for children and adults.

History

In 1905, a group of Dodge City residents asked philanthropist Andrew Carnegie to fund a library building for the city.  Carnegie responded with a grant of $7500; construction of a building at the downtown intersection of 2nd and Spruce began in 1906, and the library opened in February 1907.  It remained in the Carnegie building until 1970.  In 1979, the building was listed in the National Register of Historic Places.  In 1981, the Dodge City Arts Council obtained funds to preserve the building, operating it as the Carnegie Art Center.

The library moved to its current facility in 1981.

Other city libraries
Other libraries in the city include the DCCC Library, which holds more than 30,000 volumes and serves as a federal depository library, and the Kansas Heritage Center, a non-profit resource center and research library operated by Dodge City Public Schools dedicated to the history of Kansas, the Great Plains, and the Old West.

References

External links
 Dodge City Public Library - official site

Libraries on the National Register of Historic Places in Kansas
Library buildings completed in 1906
Buildings and structures in Dodge City, Kansas
Education in Ford County, Kansas
Public libraries in Kansas
National Register of Historic Places in Ford County, Kansas
1906 establishments in Kansas